Gokarna stands on the bank of Haral River in Bangladesh which connected with Titas River. This village was historically considered as a remote area; prior to the modern era of road travel its inhabitants relied on boats. Many highly respected people were born in Gokarna, including Nawaab Syed Shamsul Huda KCIE born in 1862 at this village. He became the first Muslim president of the Imperial Legislative Council in 1921.
In the past, people traveled from Gokarna to Dhaka and Calcutta by river.

Etymology 
Gokarna means Cow's Ear. It is so named due to the ear-shaped confluence of Haral River connected with Titas River.

Geography
Gokarna is a village of Brahmanbaria Sadar Upazila at Brahmanbaria District in the Division of Chittagong, Bangladesh.
Gokarna is located at 24°08'31.7"N 91°12'19.3"E. This is the 10th Union Council of Nasirnagar Upazila.

Haors and beels
During the rainy season Haral River links with Titas River which connects with Meghna River. Haral River blows from the east to the west at the south of the village. She looks big when over flooded and three rivers water joint together. After water dries-up, the farmer cultivates on the alluvial laid vast field and river bed becomes green Haor. Water divides in Beels like Shaapla, Balinga, Chilauri, Hasania, Tarullah, Puillya, Biduba, Hakhati, Kudal-kati, Ladra, Khujla, Haral etc. This land is called Akashi Maath or Sky Touched Land).

Each season brings different beauties in the nature that reflects in this area. Now education, health, electricity and communication have made this another modernized village in Bangladesh.

Demographics
According to the 2011 Bangladesh census, Gokarna had 1,433 households and a population of 7,218.

Administration
Gokarna Union is formed by the other village of Jethagram, Shochiura, Deghar, Pathanishar, Chotipara, Brahmanshashon, Nurpur, and Lahajura.

Communication
Sarail Upazila to Nasirnagar Upazila Dam Road crossed spirally the Haor and life for the villagers made easier to communicate with Brahmanbaria and Dhaka.

Education
Nawaab Syed Shamsul Huda founded this high school in his ancestral property named Gokarna Syed Waliuallah High School in 1915 which bestowed on the name of his same aged uncle Syed Waliullah. After that it is named Gokarna Syed Waliullah High School And College.

References

External links
 Bangladesh.jantareview.com http://bangladesh.jantareview.com
 https://web.archive.org/web/20151004235106/http://www.lged.gov.bd/DistrictArea2.aspx?Area=UnionParishad&DistrictID=14

Villages in Brahmanbaria District
Villages in Chittagong Division